Chimur is a city and a municipal council in Chandrapur District, in the state of Maharashtra, India. It is one of the Indian Parliamentary Constituencies and a Vidhan Sabha constituency.

Overview 
 
Chimur (tos) is a tehsil of Chandrapur district in Maharashtra, India, with a population of about 170,000. There are offices and a municipality of the Tehsildar, SDO, and Panchayat Samiti.

Chimur (tos) can be reached by road from Warora, which is also the nearest railway station on the Wardha-Ballarpur-Hyderabad link.

Chimur has a large market because it is so apart from other towns and cities. Chimur does not have much education, it has English and Marathi medium schools, and people can graduate in two Gownvana University colleges.

Chimur is located between Wardha, Chandrapur, Gondiya, Bhandara, Gadchiroli, and Nagpur.

History 
Chimur is famous for its active participation in the Indian Freedom Struggle during the Quit India Movement of 1942.

History 
In Chimur there is temple of Shri Hari Balaji Maharaj.

History of Ghoda yatra-
The Ghoda Yatra festival was started on the day of Vasant Panchami with Balaji Navratra. The Ghoda Ratha Yatra will conclude on February 9 with Rudra Swahakar Yadnya and Navratri will conclude on February 10. The festival will conclude on February 22 on Mahashivratri

Local attractions

There are four attractions. 

1)Shrihari Balaji Devasthan is having 1000 years old idol having & it unique one no where  world such idol balaji Persent it idol reading has done by Dr.G B Deglurkar

This park is a successful example of the conservation of the tiger, the national animal of India. The other animal species found in Tadoba are Bear, Gava (Indian Bison), and Chital (Indian Spotted Dear). The park is also famous for its biodiversity. Hospitality services are available in the park.                              

3)It is an karma bhumi of Rastrasant Tudogi Maharaj, They have done Chaturmas in 1941 at chimur            

4)last and list in 1942 chimur was Independent for 3 days no union flag was on chimur for that period

See also
Chimur Lok Sabha constituency
Gadpipari

References

Cities and towns in Chandrapur district
Talukas in Maharashtra